The men's long jump event at the 1997 European Athletics U23 Championships was held in Turku, Finland, on 12 and 13 July 1997.

Medalists

Results

Final
13 July

Qualifications
12 July
Qualify: first to 12 to the Final

Group A

Group B

Participation
According to an unofficial count, 21 athletes from 17 countries participated in the event.

 (1)
 (1)
 (1)
 (1)
 (2)
 (1)
 (1)
 (1)
 (1)
 (1)
 (2)
 (1)
 (1)
 (2)
 (1)
 (2)
 (1)

References

Long jump
Long jump at the European Athletics U23 Championships